Pama is a town in the district of Neusiedl am See in the Austrian state of Burgenland.

Geography 
Pama borders on Kittsee in the north, Gattendorf and Zurndorf in the south, Deutsch Jahrndorf in the southeast, Lower Austria in the west and Slovakia in the east.

The non-populated area is used for agriculture. There are barely any woods.

History 
After the Ottoman wars, the strongly decimated population was supplemented by the influx of Croatian-speaking population. The Burgenland Croats have shrunk noticeably in recent decades, but are still very active in community life. The majority of church services are held mainly in Croatian. The town belonged to Hungary (German-Western Hungary) until the foundation of Burgenland in 1920/21.

Before the Second World War, Jewish families lived in Pama, as well as in Kittsee, the neighboring town that was part of the seven Jewish communities in Burgenland. After the "Anschluss" of Austria to the National Socialist German Reich, the Jews living in Kittsee and Pama were expelled from their homes on 16 April 1938 and abandoned on a lonely island on the Danube.

Population

Culture and landmarks 

 Catholic Church Pama
 Piety column, Maria Immaculata
 Graveyard portal
 Piety column, white cross

Leisure and sports 

 Horse riding: The landscape is perfect for horse riding.
 Cycling: There is an extensive cycling network
 Football: The town has two football grounds.
 Tennis court
 Beach volleyball court
 Ice skating: A former fire pond is used as an ice rink by children during the winter months.
 Gym

Associations 

 SK Pama (football team)
 UFC Pama (football team)
 Vfb Energy Pama (sports club)
 Tennisclub TC Pama
 Fishing club
 Landjugend
 Pensionistenverband
 Seniorenbund
 Naturfreunde
 Jugend von Pama
 Tamburica Bijelo Selo

Politics 
The municipal council has a total of 19 members. The Social Democratic Party of Austria has 10 councillors, the Austrian People's Party 9.

Mayor is Manfred Bugnyar (SPÖ), who succeeded Josef Wetzelhofer (SPÖ) in March 2017, who led the community for 15 years. Bugnyar won the direct mayoral election with 55.74% against Hans-Jürgen Werdenich (ÖVP), who reached 44.26% and is now vice-mayor.

The head of the office is Josef Werdenich.

References

Cities and towns in Neusiedl am See District